"Wonder" is a song by English rock band Embrace, released on 20 August 2001. It was the first single from their third studio album, If You've Never Been (2001), and peaked at number 14 on the UK Singles Chart.

Track listings
UK CD1 and cassette single
 "Wonder"
 "Anywhere You Go"
 "Everyday"

UK CD2
 "Wonder"
 "Today"
 "Caught in a Rush"
 "Wonder" (video)

Charts

References

2001 singles
2001 songs
Embrace (English band) songs
Hut Records singles
Song recordings produced by Ken Nelson (British record producer)
Songs written by Danny McNamara
Songs written by Richard McNamara